Nasarawa West Senatorial District covers five local governments which include Karu, Keffi, Kokona, Nasarawa and Toto. Keffi is the headquarters (collation centre) of Nasarawa West Senatorial District. The district is currently represented by Abdullahi Adamu of the All Progressives Congress, APC.

List of senators representing Nasarawa West

References 

Nasarawa State
Senatorial districts in Nigeria